Eulepidotis bipartita is a moth of the family Erebidae first described by Paul Dognin in 1914. It is found in the Neotropical realm, including Peru.

References

Moths described in 1914
bipartita